William Bradford (September 8, 1905 – May 18, 1959) was an American cinematographer. He was nominated for an Oscar for Best Special Effects on the film Women in War at the 13th Academy Awards. He worked on more than 100 films during his career.

Selected filmography

 Women in War (1940)
 The Fighting Seabees (1940)
 Secret Service in Darkest Africa (1943)
 The Man from Music Mountain (1943)
 The San Antonio Kid (1944)
 Call of the South Seas (1944)
 San Fernando Valley (1944)
 Secrets of Scotland Yard (1944)
 Utah (1945)
 Don't Fence Me In (1945)
 Scotland Yard Investigator (1945)
 The Man from Oklahoma (1945)
 Along the Navajo Trail (1945)
 My Pal Trigger (1946)
 The Last Round-up (1947)
 Carson City Raiders (1948)
 Loaded Pistols (1948)
 Adventures of Gallant Bess (1948)
 The Blazing Sun (1950)
 The Hills of Utah (1951)
 The Old West (1952)
 Paris Model (1953)
 Top Banana (1954)
 Return to Treasure Island (1954)
 The Three Outlaws (1956)
 Outer Space Jitters (1957)

References

External links

1905 births
1959 deaths
American cinematographers
People from Barre, Vermont